John Bush is a British set decorator. He was nominated for an Academy Award in the category Best Production Design for the film Topsy-Turvy.

Selected filmography 
 Topsy-Turvy (1999; co-nominated with Eve Stewart)

References

External links 
 

Living people
Place of birth missing (living people)
Year of birth missing (living people)
British set decorators